The men's 400 metres at the 2005 World Championships in Athletics was held on August 9, 10 and 12 at the Helsinki Olympic Stadium.

Medalists

Results
All times shown are in seconds.

Heats
August 9, 2005

Heat 1
 Timothy Benjamin 44.85 Q
 Brandon Simpson 44.98 Q
 James Godday 45.30 q (PB)
 California Molefe 45.34 q (NR)
 Pierre Lavanchy 45.79 q
 Željko Vincek 46.03
 Abdesalem Khalifeh Bajes Al-Hajjaj 48.89
 Florent Battistel 50.54

Heat 2
 Jeremy Wariner 45.24 Q
 Robert Tobin 45.41 Q
 Young Talkmore Nyongani 45.55 q
 Hamdan Odha Al-Bishi 45.88 q
 Cedric van Branteghem 46.42
 Alejandro Cárdenas 46.73 (SB)
 Isaac Yaya 47.75

Heat 3
 John Steffensen 45.62 Q
 Tyler Christopher 45.66 Q
 Arismendy Peguero 45.80 q (SB)
 Eric Milazar 45.91
 Andrae Williams 46.49
 Simon Kirch 47.45
 Saeed Al-Adhreai 49.74
 Tawhid Tawhidul Islam DQ

Heat 4
 Andrew Rock 44.98 Q
 Chris Brown 45.20 Q
 Andrea Barberi 45.70 q (PB)
 Sofiane Labidi 45.71 q
 Mitsuhiro Sato 45.78 q (SB)
 Anderson Jorge dos Santos 46.32
 Chung Cheng-Kang 47.85 (PB)
 Glauco Martini 51.48

Heat 5
 Michael Blackwood 45.58 Q
 Carlos Santa 45.63 Q
 Alleyne Francique 45.77 q
 Marcin Marciniszyn 45.97
 Damion Barry 46.20
 Nery Brenes 47.11
 Ibrahim Ahmadov 48.51

Heat 6
 Gary Kikaya 45.88 Q
 Lanceford Spence 46.21 Q
 Ofentse Mogawane 46.80
 Wilan Louis 46.93
 Prasanna Sampath Amarasekara 47.11
 Chris Meke Walasi 49.47
 Boubou Gandéga DQ
 Saul Weigopwa DQ

Heat 7
 Darold Williamson 45.97 Q
 Nagmeldin Ali Abubakr 46.02 Q
 Malachi Davis 46.14
 Ato Modibo 46.28
 Leslie Djhone 46.57
 Chris Lloyd 47.13
 Moses Kamut 48.63

Semi-finals
August 10, 2005

Heat 1
 Brandon Simpson 45.53 Q
 Andrew Rock 45.78 Q
 John Steffensen 46.06 q
 Carlos Santa 46.07
 Alleyne Francique 46.59
 James Godday 46.62
 Hamdan Odha Al-Bishi 46.80
 Andrea Barberi 47.10

Heat 2
 Tyler Christopher 45.47 Q
 Darold Williamson 45.65 Q
 Timothy Benjamin 45.66 q
 Arismendy Peguero 46.08
 Gary Kikaya 46.15
 Nagmeldin Ali Abubakr 46.67
 Lanceford Spence 47.20
 Sofiane Labidi DNF

Heat 3
 Jeremy Wariner 45.65 Q
 Chris Brown 45.67 Q
 Michael Blackwood 46.25
 Robert Tobin 46.69
 Pierre Lavanchy 47.19
 Young Talkmore Nyongani 47.20
 California Molefe 47.26
 Mitsuhiro Sato 48.55

Final
August 12, 2005

 Jeremy Wariner 43.93 (WL)
 Andrew Rock 44.35 (PB)
 Tyler Christopher 44.44 (NR)
 Chris Brown 44.48 (PB)
 Timothy Benjamin 44.93
 Brandon Simpson 45.01
 Darold Williamson 45.12
 John Steffensen 45.46

External links
Official results, heats - IAAF.org
Official results, semi-final - IAAF.org
Official results, final - IAAF.org

400 metres
400 metres at the World Athletics Championships